Hillary Rika Hauser (born in 1944) is an American photojournalist and environmental activist with a focus on the oceans — underwater diving adventure, politics, and conservation. In 2009, in recognition of her ocean environmental work as it relates to underwater diving, Hauser received the NOGI Award for Distinguished Service from the Academy of Underwater Arts and Sciences. In 2013 the Academy elected Hauser as president of its board of directors.

Writer
An author, journalist and news reporter, Hauser has six published books about the sea and underwater exploration, as well as numerous articles in major periodicals  including National Geographic, Geo, Islands, Esquire, Redbook, The Surfer’s Journal, Reader’s Digest and the Los Angeles Times. From 1969 through 1977 she was West Coast stringer for Ocean Science News  Washington D.C., and from 1981 to 1986 was ocean/marine reporter for the Santa Barbara News-Press.

Diver
Hauser started scuba diving in 1966 and was an editor of Skin Diver Magazine from 1969 to 1971. In 1979 she became publicist for the Diving Equipment Manufacturers (now Marketing) Association (DEMA), and came up with the bumper sticker program, "Discover Diving," a label that went on to become a major promotional jingle in the dive world, as well as a title to a magazine. She has made over 5,000 dives and was inducted into the Women Divers Hall of Fame in 2000.

Environmental activist
An environmental activist, in 1998, Hauser co-founded Heal the Ocean, a 3,000-member environmental advocacy group in Santa Barbara, California, and serves as its executive director. The organization focuses on wastewater technology as it impacts the ocean, facilitating wastewater treatment plant upgrade and removal of septic tanks from creeks, marshes, bays and beaches. For this, and other work, Hauser and Heal the Ocean have been commended with recognition from the U.S. Congress, as well the Central Coast (California) Regional Water Quality Control Board (2006, 2008), the California State Assembly (2009), and in 2-13 more recently a Joint Assembly/Senate Resolution (No. 404) from the California Legislature (Jackson/Williams). For their 15 years of working to remove septic systems from 7 miles of south Santa Barbara County beaches, including the world-famous Rincon surf break, Hauser and Heal the Ocean organization received a Commendation from the Regional Water Quality Control Board on January 19, 2015, and commendations also came from the California State Senate and the Santa Barbara County Board of Supervisors. Singer-songwriter Jack Johnson included Hauser on his 2017 list of 13 Coastal Heroes for Coastal Living Magazine.

Classical pianist
A lifelong classical pianist, Hauser served as a classical music reviewer for the Santa Barbara News-Press from 1981 through 1996. In 2000 Hauser created, with John Robinson, the record label Tavros Records], through which she produced recordings of Rachmaninoff Trios and Chopin solo piano works that have won high ratings in the Penguin Guide to Recorded Classical Music.

Bibliography
 "In the Basement of Skyscrapers (Diving the Big Wave Reefs of the World: Waimea, Jaws, Pipeline and Mavericks)," The Surfer’s Journal, 2003, vol. 12 No. 3
  "Shipwrecked with Jeff Johnson (paddling from Maui to Molokai),"  The Surfer’s Journal, 2000, vol. 9 No. 5
 Avonturen Onder Water, VIPMEDIA, 1997, 
 Abenteur Unter Wasser. Jahr Verlag, 1997, 
 Book of Marine Fishes, Best Pub Co., 1995,  Book of Marine Fishes on Amazon 
 Book of Fishes, 2nd Edition, 1992, Gulf Publishing Co. 
 The Adventurous Aquanaut, 1991, Best Publishing Co.,  The Adventurous Aquanaut on Amazon
 Skin Diver Magazine’s Book of Fishes, Pisces Books, 1987, Skin Diver Magazine's Book of Fishes on Amazon
 Call to Adventure, Bookmakers Guild, 1987, Call to Adventure on Amazon
 "History of Diving," Compton’s Encyclopedia and Fact-Index, 1986, 
 "Exploring a Sunken Realm in Australia," National Geographic, 1984, Vol 165. No. 1
 "Living World of the Reef" (with Bob Evans), Walker & Co., 1978, 
 Scuba diving (Women in Sports), Harvey House, 1976, Scuba diving (Women in Sports) on Amazon
 "Heal The Ocean Santa Barbara Benefit: Hillary Hauser for Clean Water and Environment," Santa Barbara Arts TV YouTube Partner Global News,  
 Heal the Ocean, Newsletter 2013
 Heal the Ocean, Newsletter 2014
 Heal the Ocean, Newsletter 2015
 Heal the Ocean, Newsletter 2016
 Heal the Ocean, Newsletter 2017
 Heal the Ocean, Newsletter 2018
 Heal the Ocean, Newsletter 2019

Notes

Living people
1944 births
American photojournalists
American non-fiction writers
American women writers
American women journalists
American underwater divers
People from Santa Barbara, California
Underwater photographers
Journalists from California
21st-century American women